Rubén Ramírez Hidalgo and José Antonio Sánchez-de Luna were the defending champions, however Sánchez-de Luna chose not to compete this year.Ramírez Hidalgo partnered up with Juan Pablo Brzezicki, but they lost to Marco Crugnola and Daniel Muñoz-de la Nava in the semifinals.
Croatian pair Ivan Dodig and Lovro Zovko won in the final 6–4, 6–4, against Crugnola and Muñoz-de la Nava.

Seeds

Draw

Draw

References
 Doubles Draw

Alessandria Challenger - Doubles
Alessandria Challenger